Neopsammodius werneri is a species of aphodiine dung beetle in the family Scarabaeidae. It is found in Central America and North America.

References

Further reading

 

Scarabaeidae
Articles created by Qbugbot
Beetles described in 1955
Beetles of Central America
Beetles of North America